William Fox Tomson (18 May 1842 – 12 June 1882) was an English cricketer active in 1861. He was born at Ramsgate, Kent.

He made one appearance in first-class cricket for Kent against England at Lord's in 1861. He batted once in the match, scoring 2 runs before he was dismissed by Billy Caffyn, as well as taking a single catch in England's first-innings, with Kent winning the match by an innings and 74 runs.

Tomson had at least one daughter. He died at the town of his birth on 12 June 1882.

References

External links

1842 births
1882 deaths
People from Ramsgate
English cricketers
Kent cricketers